The  Prakirnaka Sutras , in short  Prakirnaka  are the "Holy Text"s (of Jainism)  fourth part, called the "Complimentarys", the "Angabahya", The translation of "Prakirnaka Sutras" is "Various texts" or "Collection of Miscellaneous Texts". Only ten of the twenty Prakirnaka  are recognized by the Shvetambara, which are the actual majority of Jain believers.
These Sutras deal with the "Great Virtues", the Mahavratas, and death. They also name hymns and prayers.

Presumably the texts were written between the VI and XIII< century A.D.

The content 
The " Prakirnaka Sutras " content:

 Chatuh shravan- prayers to Arihant, Sidha, Sadhu.
 Atur pratyakhyana or Ayurpachakhana This " agama " explaining prayer and death depending on age.
 Bhakti parijna or Bhatta parinna explains how to do fasting.
 Sanstaraka or Santara
 Tandulavaitaliya Talks about pregnancy and information about the human body. 
 Chandra vedhyaka (Candra-vedhyaka *)
 Devendrastava This part lists up the devas, their palaces and their ranking, also it explains the stars, the planets, the moon and the sun.
 Ganita vidhya (Gaṇi-vidyā*)
 Mahapratyakhyana Advice how to become free from sin and how to repent.
 Virstava
 Shvetambhara Murtipujaka(
 * Name used by Nalini Balbir

Annotations

See also 
 Transtheism

Literature

External links

Réferences 

Jain texts